The Living Planet Report is published every two years by the World Wide Fund for Nature since 1998. It is based on the Living Planet Index and ecological footprint calculations.

The Living Planet Report is the world's leading, science-based analysis, on the health of our planet and the impact of human activity.  Humanity's demands exceed the Earth's capacity to sustain us.

The 2018 report found a "decline of 60% in population sizes" of vertebrate species overall from 1970 to 2014. The tropics of South and Central America had an 89% loss compared to 1970. These claims have been criticized by some studies such as the research group led by Brian Leung and including Maria Dornelas.

The 2018 report calls for new goals post-2020 alongside those of the Convention on Biological Diversity, the Paris Climate Agreement and the Sustainable Development Goals.  The 2020 report says systemic changes are necessary to stop the destruction of global wildlife populations, including a complete overhaul of food production and consumption industries, along with making global trade more sustainable and removing deforestation completely from global supply chains.

The 2022 report found that vertebrate wildlife populations have declined by an average of almost 70% since 1970, and attributes the loss primarily to agriculture and fishing. The estimate was based on an analysis of 32,000 populations of 5,230 animal species.

Editions 
The first version of the Living Planet Report was published on 1998. Following versions in 1999, 2000, 2002, 2004, 2006, 2008, 2010, 2012, 2014, 2016, 2018 and 2020.

See also
 Holocene extinction

References

External links
 Official website
 Summary of the Living Planet Report 2016
 https://www.youtube.com/watch?v=5_urelnADjI

Environmental reports